Sokumvatnet is a lake that lies in the municipality of Gildeskål in Nordland county, Norway. It lies just south of the lake Litle Sokumvatnet and northeast of the lake Langvatnet. The lake serves as a reservoir for the Sundsfjord Hydroelectric Power Station.

See also
 List of lakes in Norway
 Geography of Norway

References

Lakes of Nordland
Gildeskål